The Rayen class is a series of 4 container ships built for Islamic Republic of Iran Shipping Line (IRISL). The ships were built by Hyundai Heavy Industries in South Korea. The ships have a maximum theoretical capacity of around 14,500 twenty-foot equivalent units (TEU). The ships were originally ordered by IRISL in 2016.

List of ships

References 

Container ship classes
Ships built by Hyundai Heavy Industries Group